Cícero Nogueira Braga (born 7 March 1958) is a Brazilian chess International master (IM) (1991), Brazilian Chess Championships medalist (1978, 1979, 1988), Chess Olympiad individual bronze medal winner (1978).

Biography 
From the mid-1970s to the mid-2000s Cícero Braga was one of Brazil's leading chess players. He regularly participated in Brazilian Chess Championships. His best results was three times won silver medals: 1978, 1979, and 1988.

Cícero Braga played for Brazil in the Chess Olympiads:
 In 1978, at fourth board in the 23rd Chess Olympiad in Buenos Aires (+7, =2, -2) and won individual bronze medal,
 In 1988, at first reserve board in the 28th Chess Olympiad in Thessaloniki (+5, =3, -1),
 In 1992, at first reserve board in the 30th Chess Olympiad in Manila (+3, =1, -3),
 In 1996, at third board in the 32nd Chess Olympiad in Yerevan (+6, =3, -5),
 In 2000, at second reserve board in the 34th Chess Olympiad in Istanbul (+4, =1, -2),
 In 2002, at second reserve board in the 35th Chess Olympiad in Bled (+5, =3, -0),
 In 2004, at third board in the 36th Chess Olympiad in Calvià (+2, =6, -3),
 In 2008, at fourth board in the 38th Chess Olympiad in Dresden (+2, =5, -1).

Cícero Braga played for Brazil in the Pan American Team Chess Championships:
 In 1991, at fourth board in the 4th Panamerican Team Chess Championship in Guarapuava (+1, =1, -0) and won team silver medal,
 In 1995, at second reserve board in the 5th Panamerican Team Chess Championship in Cascavel (+1, =1, -0) and won team bronze medal,
 In 2003, at third board in the 7th Panamerican Team Chess Championship in Rio de Janeiro (+0, =2, -0) and won team silver medal.

Cícero Braga played for Brazil in the World Student Team Chess Championship:
 In 1977, at first reserve board in the 22nd World Student Team Chess Championship in Mexico City (+5, =2, -3).

Cícero Braga played for Brazil in the World Youth U26 Team Chess Championship:
 In 1978, at first board in the 1st World Youth U26 Team Chess Championship in Mexico City (+2, =3, -5),
 In 1980, at third board in the 2nd World Youth U26 Team Chess Championship in Mexico City (+6, =2, -5),
 In 1981, at third board in the 3rd World Youth U26 Team Chess Championship in Graz (+2, =4, -3),
 In 1983, at second board in the 4th World Youth U26 Team Chess Championship in Chicago (+2, =7, -1).

In 1991, Cícero Braga was awarded the FIDE International Master (IM) title.

References

External links 

Cícero Braga chess games at 365chess.com

1958 births
Living people
Chess International Masters
Brazilian chess players
Chess Olympiad competitors
20th-century chess players
20th-century Brazilian people